Laurent Johann José Bourda-Couhet (born July 12, 1994) is a Brazilian rugby sevens player.

References

External links 
 
 
 
 

1994 births
Living people
Male rugby sevens players
Sportspeople from Pau, Pyrénées-Atlantiques
People with acquired Brazilian citizenship
Brazilian rugby union players
Olympic rugby sevens players of Brazil
Brazil international rugby sevens players
Rugby sevens players at the 2016 Summer Olympics
Rugby sevens players at the 2019 Pan American Games
Pan American Games competitors for Brazil
Cobras Brasil XV players
Rugby union scrum-halves
Rugby union wings
Brazilian people of French descent
Brazilian rugby sevens players